Eleazar of Worms (אלעזר מוורמייזא - also מגרמייזא of Garmiza or Garmisa) (c. 1176–1238), or Eleazar ben Judah ben Kalonymus, also sometimes known today as Eleazar Rokeach ("Eleazar the Perfumer"  אלעזר רקח) from the title of his Book of the Perfumer (Sefer ha rokeah ספר הרקח)—where the numerical value of "Perfumer" (in Hebrew) is equal to Eleazar, was a leading Talmudist and Kabbalist, and the last major member of the Hasidei Ashkenaz, a group of German Jewish pietists.

Biography 
Eleazar was most likely born in Mainz. Through his father Judah ben Kalonymus, he was a descendant of the great Kalonymus family of Mainz. Eleazar was also a disciple of Judah ben Samuel of Regensburg (Judah he-Hasid), who initiated him into the study of the Kabbalah, at that time little known in Germany. According to Zunz, Eleazar was hazzan at Erfurt before he became rabbi at Worms. In 1233 he took part in the Synod of Mainz which enacted the body of regulations known as "Takkanot Shum" (ShUM = "Speyer, Worms, Mainz"), of which he was a signatory.
                                  

According to the Jewish Encyclopedia, Eleazar underwent great sufferings during the Crusades. The Jewish Encyclopedia states that on the night of 22 Kislev, 1196, he was engaged in his commentary on Genesis (Eleazar relates that he had reached the parashah Vayeshev), when two Crusaders entered his house and killed his wife Dulca (Dolce), his two daughters Belet (Belette) and Hannah, and wounded him and his son Jacob who did not escape. His wife had conducted a business in parchment scrolls in order to support the family and enable him to devote all his time to study.  Many of the piyyutim he authored protest at Israel's suffering and hope for redemption and revenge against her tormentors. He also recorded the deaths of his family in a moving and poetic eulogy.

Eleazar developed a vigorous activity in many directions. On the one hand, he was a Talmudist of vast erudition, a liturgist gifted with a clear and easy style, and an astronomer, and was well versed in the sciences open to the Jews of Germany at that time. At the same time, he was an adventurous mystic who experienced visions, seeing legions of angels and demons. He exerted himself to spread mystical systems which went far beyond the conceptions of the classical authors of Jewish esoterica. In his mystical works he developed and gave a new impulse to the mysticism associated with the letters of the alphabet.  By the gematria and notarikon systems of interpretation found in the Talmud, Eleazar invented new combinations by which miracles could be performed. The haggadic anthropomorphism which he had combated in his earlier works (Ha-Roḳeaḥ, Sha'are ha-Sod weha-Yiḥud) occupied later the foremost place in his mystical writings.
Eleazar's great merit therefore lies not only in his new mystical system, but also in his ethical works. In these he shows greatness of soul and a piety bordering upon asceticism. Though so severely tried by fate, he inculcates cheerfulness, patience, and love for humanity. He died at Worms in 1238.

Ethical works 
 Ha-Roḳeaḥ, ("The Perfumer"), a halachic guide to ethics and Jewish Law for the common reader.  The title derives from the numerical value of the word רקח, which corresponds to that of אלעזר. The book is divided into 497 paragraphs containing halachot and ethics; first published at Fano, 1505.
 Adderet ha-Shem, still extant in manuscript in the Vatican Library.
 Moreh Ḥaṭṭa'im, or Seder ha-Kapparot, on penitence and confession of sin, first published at Venice, 1543. This work, which is included in the Hilkot Teshubah of the Ha-Roḳeaḥ, has been reproduced many times under various titles. It appeared under the title Darke Teshubah at the end of the responsa of Meir of Rothenburg in the Prague edition; as Inyane Teshubah, or Seder Teshubah, in the Sephardic ritual of 1584; as Yesod Teshubah, with additions by Isaac ben Moses Elles, first published in 1583; as Yore Ḥaṭṭa'im ba-Derek; and as Sefer ha-Kapparot. The title adopted here is the same as that given in the Kol Bo, in which the work was reproduced.
 Sefer ha-Ḥayyim, treating of the unity of God, of the soul and its attributes, and of the three stages (recognized by the ancients as "plant, animal, and intellectual") in man's life.
Sha'are ha-Sod ha-Yiḥud weha-Emunah, a treatise on the unity and incorporeality of God, combating the anthropomorphism of the Aggadah (published by Adolf Jellinek in the Kokabe Yiẓḥaḳ collection [xxvii.].
Kether Shem Tov. The Crown Of The Good Name, by Avraham ben Alexander of Cologne, disciple of Eleazar Ben Yehudah of Worms: Ethical-Kabbalist book.

Pietistic works 
 Yir'at El, still extant in manuscript in the Vatican Library, containing mystical commentaries on Psalm 67, on the Menorah, and on Sefirat ha-Omer. In 2001 this work was published as part of the book דרוש המלבוש והצמצום.
 Sefer ha-Kabod, mystical explanations of various Biblical passages (Neubauer, Cat. Bodl. Hebr. MSS. No. 1566, 1).
 Yayin ha-Reḳaḥ, mystical commentaries on the five Megillot. Those on Book of Ruth and the Song of Songs were published at Lublin, 1608.
 A commentary on Psalm 145. (MS. De Rossi No. 1138).
 A commentary on the prayers mentioned by Joseph Solomon Delmedigo in his Maẓref la-Ḥokmah (p. 14b). Printed by Hirshler.
 Ta'ame we-Sodot ha-Tefillah (Neubauer, ib. No.1575.)
 Perush 'al Sefer Yeẓirah, a commentary on the Sefer Yetzirah, being extracts from Shabbethai Donnolo's commentary. Fragments of this work were first published at Mantua in 1562, later in several other places; a complete edition was printed at Przemysl, 1883.
 Midrash we-Perush 'al ha-Torah, mystical commentary on the Pentateuch, mentioned by Azulai, recently printed by klugman.
Sha'are Binah, in which, interpreting Biblical verses by the system of gemaṭriyyot, he shows the origin of many haggadot of the Talmud. This work is frequently quoted by Solomon al-Ḳabiẓ, in his Manot ha-Lewi.
 Shi'ur Komah, a commentary on the Shi'ur Komah, the Pirḳe de-Rabbi Yishma'el, and the Merkabah (MS. Michael).
Sefer ha-Ḥokmah, mystical treatise on the various names of God and of angels, and on the seventy-three "Gates of the Torah", שערי תורה.
 Sefer ha-Shem, mystical dissertations on the names of twenty-two letters, with a table of permutations (Neubauer, ib. No. 1569, 4).
 Eser Shemot, commentary on the ten names of God (MS. Michael, No. 175).
 A commentary on the piyyuṭ "Ha-Oḥez."
 Six small cabalistic treatises entitled Sod ha-Ziwwug, Sefer ha-Ne'elam, Sefer Mal'akim, Sefer Tagim, Sefer Pesaḳ, and Sefer ha-Ḳolot, all of which are still extant in manuscript (Neubauer, ib. No. 1566).
 Liḳḳuṭim, mystical fragments, mentioned by Menahem Recanati.
 Sode Raza, a treatise on the mysteries of the "Merkabah." Part of this work was published at Amsterdam in 1701, under the title Sefer Razi'el ha-Gadol. In the introduction the editor says that he decided to publish this book after having seen that the greater part of it had been produced in French under the title Images des Lettres de l'Alphabet.

In addition to these works, Eleazar wrote tosafot to many Talmudical treatises, referred to by Bezalel Ashkenazi in his Shiṭṭah Meḳubbeẓet; a commentary on "Sheḳalim" in the Jerusalem Talmud, cited by Asheri in his commentary to that treatise in the Babylonian Talmud; thirty-six chapters on the examination of slaughtered animals (MS. Michael No. 307). Zunz enumerates fifty-five liturgical poems and dirges composed by Eleazar and occurring in the Ashkenazic maḥzorim, ḳinot, and seliḥot.

Sources 

Kabbalists
Medieval Jewish astronomers
German Tosafists
1170s births
1238 deaths
Rabbis from Mainz
Rabbis from Worms, Germany
12th-century German rabbis
13th-century German rabbis
Angelic visionaries
13th-century astrologers
12th-century German writers
13th-century German writers
Authors of books on Jewish law
Exponents of Jewish law